La fuga (also known as The Escape) is a 1964 Italian drama film directed by Paolo Spinola. For this film Giovanna Ralli was awarded with a David di Donatello for Best Actress.

Cast 
Giovanna Ralli: Piera
Anouk Aimée: Luisa
Paul Guers: Andrea
Enrico Maria Salerno: Analyst
Maurizio Arena: Alberto
Jone Salinas: Mother of Andrea
Guido Alberti: Father of Piera
Carol Walker: Mother of Piera

Reception
According to Fox records, the film needed to earn $700,000 in rentals to break even and made $230,000, meaning it made a loss.

References

External links

1964 films
Italian drama films
Films scored by Piero Piccioni
1960s Italian films